Rupert Polius (born 5 November 1944) is a Saint Lucian cricketer. He played in five first-class matches for the Windward Islands from 1968 to 1973.

See also
 List of Windward Islands first-class cricketers

References

External links
 

1944 births
Living people
Saint Lucian cricketers
Windward Islands cricketers